Interstate H-3 (H-3) is an Interstate Highway located entirely within the US state of Hawaii on the island of Oʻahu. H-3 is also known as the John A. Burns Freeway, after the second governor of Hawaii. It crosses the Koʻolau Range along several viaducts and through the  Tetsuo Harano Tunnels as well as the much smaller Hospital Rock Tunnels.

Despite the number, signage is that of an east–west highway. Its western terminus is at an interchange with H-1 at Halawa near Pearl Harbor. Its eastern end is at the main gate of Marine Corps Base Hawaii (MCBH). This route satisfies the national defense purpose of connecting MCBH with the US Navy port at Pearl Harbor off H-1.

Orders for the freeway were granted in 1960, followed by planning stages. Construction, amid enormous community protest, was begun in the late 1980s, although the road did not open until December 12, 1997. Environmental complaints and legal challenges halted construction at many points. Construction resumed during the late 1980s after a move by US Senator Daniel Inouye, who, in 1986, had the freeway exempted from most environmental laws as a rider on a Department of Defense budget bill.

H-3 was one of the most expensive Interstate Highways ever built, on a cost-per-mile basis. Its final cost was $1.3 billion (equivalent to $ in ), or approximately $80 million per mile (/km; equivalent to $ per mile [/km] in ).

Route description

H-3 begins northwest of Downtown Honolulu at the Halawa Interchange with H-1 and auxiliary route H-201. The interchange is adjacent to Aloha Stadium and northeast of Joint Base Pearl Harbor–Hickam, which includes Pearl Harbor National Memorial. H-3 has direct access to H-1, which continues south to Daniel K. Inouye International Airport and west toward Pearl City, and an onramp from the Aloha Stadium parking lot. The freeway travels east along Hālawa Stream and parallel to H-201, which it intersects near Salt Lake. H-3 then turns northeast and heads toward Koʻolau Range by following Hālawa Valley.

The freeway then runs on Windward Viaducts through Hālawa Valley for about  until it reaches the Tetsuo Harano Tunnels through Koʻolau Range. Once on the eastern end of the tunnel, the freeway follows a viaduct built along the side of Haʻikū Valley until the Kaneohe Interchange with Route 63 (Likelike Highway) which leads into the town of Kāneʻohe. The freeway then continues past the Kaneohe Interchange to the Halekou Interchange with Route 83 (Kamehameha Highway) and from there to the Kauila interchange with Route 65 (Mokapu Saddle Road) and the Mokapu Interchange serving Kaneohe Bay Drive. After the Mokapu Interchange, H-3 spans a causeway between Kāneʻohe Bay and Nuʻupia Pond and ends at the main gate of MCBH.

History

A set of Interstate Highways on Oʻahu were approved for funding by the US Congress in 1960, a year after Hawaii was admitted as a state. A corridor connecting the Honolulu area to Kāneʻohe was included in the plan and was designated as "Interstate H-3" by the Bureau of Public Roads (now the Federal Highway Administration) on August 29, 1960.

Since its inception, the H-3 freeway has been mired in controversy. The original route was not set to be in current Hālawa Valley, but rather, the nearest major valley due east, in the Moanalua ahupuaʻa. The Damon family hurried to create the Moanalua Gardens Foundation in 1970 to join the forces of all political and cultural groups who opposed the freeway's construction through their tract of land. The foundation's pinnacle no-build argument was the need to remove a significant historical stone containing ancient petroglyphs, Pohaku ka Luahine, which, to this day, stands intact along the Moanalua valley trail. Success came their way as this freeway route was dropped, but H-3 would merely be rerouted.

Kānaka Maoli (Native Hawaiian) cultural practitioners continue to call for the highway's removal since it runs through an area of extreme cultural significance, according to their interpretation. The Bishop Museum, which did the historical and archeological research, has published extensive reports that generally ascribe lower cultural significance to these sites relative to other sites in Hawaii. Many contend that the freeway is "cursed" due to its destruction of religious sites and is therefore harmful even to those who traverse it. 

Ongoing environmental concerns include weed encroachment, light pollution, asbestos pollution, water and streamlife problems, and a host of other concerns; among these are the ongoing decline of native owls called pueo and other native birds. For example, the Oʻahu ʻalauahio (Paroreomyza maculata), whose last known home was Halawa, has had no sightings since H-3 construction was completed.

Some longtime residents of Koʻolaupoko and other East Shore communities continue to object to the freeway's developmental impacts on their communities. Among their primary fears are urbanization on the scale of Honolulu via the freeway, which has the potential to bring heavy traffic and growth into their traditionally quiet neighborhoods, as well as affecting the value of their homes in the relatively rural (until recently) communities.

Conversely, this road is considered an engineering wonder by its admirers. It is often compared to various cinematic landscapes in Star Wars and other movies, and it does sometimes reduce travel time for cross-island commuters, which has allowed for increased real estate development and prices in windward Oʻahu.

One anecdote relates to the elevated section passing through Haʻikū Valley. In this valley, the viaduct passed beneath the antenna of a US Coast Guard radio transmission facility. It was thought that the energy field from the antenna could interfere with heart pacemakers—a potential detriment to drivers and passengers on the roadway. A giant metal cage was designed to surround the roadway through the valley. Before H-3 was opened, the US Coast Guard closed their transmitting facility, obviating the need for the cage. Although the full cage was never built, buried within the roadway was the bottom of the cage. HDOT decided to not construct this steel mesh prior to opening of the freeway.

In September 2020, a section of the H-3 freeway (the Tetsuo Harano Tunnel ) was closed for two days to serve as a COVID-19 surge testing site for up to 10,000 people. The freeway was selected to allow for long queuing lanes leading up to testing stations at the Kaneohe and Halawa tunnel portals.

Exit list

References

External links

H-3: The Island Interstate (1993)

H3
Interstate Highways in Hawaii
Transportation in Honolulu County, Hawaii